The 106 Squadron of the Israeli Air Force, also known as Spearhead Squadron (Hebrew:טייסת חוד החנית), was created on June 13, 1948, for transportation purposes. The aircraft roster originally had various transport aircraft such as the C-46 Commandos, L-049 Constellations and Douglas C-54 Skymaster. It flew under the cover of a fake airliner company called Lineas Aereas de Panama. It first participated in Operation Balak, but was disbanded in June 1949. The Squadron's aircraft were transferred to an airliner company called Arkia Airlines.  It was not reformed until June 11, 1982, and fought in the 1982 Lebanon War. Since the Lebanon War, the Squadron was credited with five aerial victories from 1982-1985.  The Squadron's F-15s flew combat air patrols during Desert Storm to screen possible air attacks from the Iraqi Air Force. It currently operates F-15B/C/D fighters out of Tel Nof Airbase.

See also 

1983 Israeli Air Force F-15 crash

References

External links 
The Second Eagle Squadron 
Global Security Profile

Israeli Air Force squadrons
Military units and formations established in 1948
Military units and formations disestablished in 1949
Military units and formations established in 1982
1982 establishments in Israel